''Strobilops'' sp. nov. 1 is an (as of 2007 unnamed) undescribed species of air-breathing land snail, a terrestrial pulmonate gastropod mollusk in the family Strobilopsidae.

This species is endemic to Nicaragua.

References

Endemic fauna of Nicaragua
Molluscs of Central America
Strobilopsidae
Undescribed gastropod species
Taxonomy articles created by Polbot